Burns Harbor is a town in Westchester Township, Porter County, Indiana, United States on the shores of Lake Michigan in Northwest Indiana. It is part of the Chicago metropolitan area. The population was 1,156 at the 2010 census. Burns Harbor is located adjacent to the Indiana Dunes, an area that conservationists have fought hard to preserve.

Geography
Burns Harbor is located at  (41.614685, -87.124560).

Demographics

2010 census
As of the census of 2010, there were 1,156 people, 456 households, and 305 families living in the town. The racial makeup of the town was 95.4% White, 1.8% African American, 0.3% Native American, 0.3% Asian, 1.1% from other races, and 1.1% from two or more races. Hispanic or Latino of any race were 5.8% of the population.

There were 456 households, of which 37.3% had children under the age of 18 living with them, 51.5% were married couples living together, 10.3% had a female householder with no husband present, 5.0% had a male householder with no wife present, and 33.1% were non-families. 26.1% of all households were made up of individuals, and 7.4% had someone living alone who was 65 years of age or older. The average household size was 2.54 and the average family size was 3.10.

The median age in the town was 34.6 years. 26.2% of residents were under the age of 18; 6.4% were between the ages of 18 and 24; 31% were from 25 to 44; 25.6% were from 45 to 64; and 10.6% were 65 years of age or older. The gender makeup of the town was 50.8% male and 49.2% female.

2000 census
As of the census of 2000, there were 766 people, 303 households, and 219 families living in the town. The racial makeup of the town was 94.26% White, 0.26% African American, 1.17% Native American, 1.04% Asian, 0.39% from other races, and 2.87% from two or more races. Hispanic or Latino of any race were 4.31% of the population.

There were 303 households, out of which 30.7% had children under the age of 18 living with them, 57.1% were married couples living together, 7.9% had a female householder with no husband present, and 27.4% were non-families. 22.8% of all households were made up of individuals, and 7.3% had someone living alone who was 65 years of age or older. The average household size was 2.53 and the average family size was 2.95.

In the town, the population was spread out, with 24.7% under the age of 18, 8.0% from 18 to 24, 28.5% from 25 to 44, 28.3% from 45 to 64, and 10.6% who were 65 years of age or older. The median age was 38 years. For every 100 females, there were 103.7 males. For every 100 females age 18 and over, there were 111.4 males.

The median income for a household in the town was $53,929, and the median income for a family was $57,188. Males had a median income of $43,393 versus $22,143 for females. The per capita income for the town was $23,344. About 4.2% of families and 6.3% of the population were below the poverty line, including 5.4% of those under age 18 and 5.6% of those age 65 or over.

History
Burns Harbor was founded in 1966. The town took its name from a local port which was named for the harbor's promoter Randall W. Burns.

Transportation
Burns Harbor benefits from close access to many major forms of transportation.

Airports
 Gary/Chicago International Airport (GYY) in Gary
 O'Hare International Airport (ORD) in Chicago
 Chicago Midway International Airport (MDW) in Chicago
 South Bend Regional Airport (SBN) in South Bend
 Porter County Regional Airport (VPZ) in Valparaiso

Commuter Rail
 The South Shore Line provides service between Chicago and South Bend. The closest station is located at Ogden Dunes, Indiana. The South Shore is operated by the Northern Indiana Commuter Transportation District (NICTD).

Ports
 The Port of Indiana-Burns Harbor which includes an international shipping port and the Burns Waterway Small Boat Harbor for public access to Lake Michigan.  The Port of Indiana-Burns Harbor is divided between Burns Harbor and Portage. 

Highways
 Interstate 80
 Interstate 90
 Interstate 94
 U.S. Route 12
 U.S. Route 20
 Indiana State Road 149

Education
Burns Harbor is served by Duneland Schools (http://www.duneland.k12.in.us) providing education for grades Kindergarten through 12, and is in close proximity to many higher education facilities including:
 Indiana University Northwest (IUN)
 Ivy Tech Community College of Indiana (Ivy Tech)
 Purdue University North Central (PNC)
 Purdue University Calumet (Purdue Cal)
 Valparaiso University  (Valpo)

References

External links

 Town of Burns Harbor, Indiana website
 Photographs of the ArcelorMittal steel works
 Burns Harbor Waterway

Towns in Porter County, Indiana
Inland port cities and towns in Indiana
Populated places established in 1967
Indiana populated places on Lake Michigan
Towns in Indiana